Halfpenny Gate is a small village in southern County Antrim, Northern Ireland. It is within the townland of Creenagh, between Moira, Maghaberry and Lurganure. In the 2001 Census it had a population of 60 people. It is in the Lisburn and Castlereagh City Council area.

Locally significant buildings include an Orange Hall built in 1910.

References 

NI Neighbourhood Information System

See also 
List of towns and villages in Northern Ireland

Villages in County Antrim